Dermatolepis is a genus of marine ray-finned fish, groupers from the subfamily Epinephelinae, part of the family Serranidae, which also includes the anthias and sea basses. They are found in the western Atlantic, Pacific and Indian Oceans.

Species 
The genus Dermatolepis contains these species:

 Dermatolepis dermatolepis (Boulenger, 1895) - Leather bass  
 Dermatolepis inermis (Valenciennes, 1833) - Marbled grouper
 Dermatolepis striolata (Playfair, 1867) - Smooth grouper

References

 
Epinephelini
Taxonomy articles created by Polbot